Hotel Vier Jahreszeiten Kempinski Munich is a five-star luxury hotel in Munich, Germany. It is part of the Kempinski chain of hotels. It was opened in 1858 and is located at Maximilianstraße 17 in the centre of Munich.

Notable guests

Royalty
 Archduke Franz Ferdinand of Austria
 Empress Elisabeth of Austria
 Queen Elizabeth II
 Edward VIII (in October 1937, during his visit to Germany)

Others
 Konrad Adenauer
 Winston Churchill
 Sean "Diddy" Combs
 Plácido Domingo
 Otto Hahn
 Reinhard Heydrich
 Elton John
 Bob Fosse (in 1970, while researching his 1972 film Cabaret)
 Sophia Loren
 Vladimir Putin
 Romy Schneider
 Elizabeth Taylor
 The Rolling Stones
 Sir Peter Ustinov
 Rudolf von Sebottendorf
 Robbie Williams

See also
 Hotel Vier Jahreszeiten (Hamburg)

References

External links
 
 
 Hotel Vier Jahreszeiten München – Geschichte und Photos in cosmopolis.ch (in German)

Vier Jahreszeiten
Kempinski Hotels
Commercial buildings completed in 1858
Hotels established in 1858
Hotel buildings completed in 1858
19th-century architecture in Germany